Frank Ghent (13 October 1897 – 21 October 1965) was an Irish footballer. He competed in the men's tournament at the 1924 Summer Olympics.

References

External links

1897 births
1965 deaths
Irish association footballers (before 1923)
Olympic footballers of Ireland
Footballers at the 1924 Summer Olympics
People from Athlone
Association football forwards
Athlone Town A.F.C. players